Megachile naevia is a species of bee in the family Megachilidae. It was described by Kohl in 1906.

References

Naevia
Insects described in 1906